Vasyl Valeriyovych Storchak (born 21 June 1965) is a Ukrainian professional football coach and a former player.

Career
Storchak started his professional career at the Lviv army club, SKA Lvov (Soviet First League) which merged with FC Karpaty Lviv. Later he played briefly for Torpedo Lutsk and Dnipro Dnipropetrovsk before moving to Metalurh Zaporizhzhia. In the Soviet Top League he played total of 31 games and scored two goals. Until 1992 Storchak played in Ukraine, but soon after the start of the 1992–93 season he transferred to Russia in 1992 where its season was coming to a close. In Russia Storchak stayed until 1996 switching two clubs FC Asmaral Moscow and FC Sokol Saratov. In 1996, he came back to Zaporizhzhia where he played until 1997 (FC Torpedo Zaporizhzhia). In the beginning of 1998 Storchak moved to Moldova for half of season (FC Tiraspol). Later same year he came back to Ukraine (MFC Mykolaiv). In 2000-2001 Storchak played for lower league teams such as SSSOR Metalurh Zaporizhzhia and ZAlK Zaporizhzhia (amateurs).

Honours
 Soviet Top League champion: 1988.
 Soviet Top League runner-up: 1987.
 Soviet Cup winner: 1989 (played in the early stages of the 1988/89 tournament for FC Dnipro Dnipropetrovsk).
 USSR Federation Cup winner: 1986.

External links
 

1965 births
People from Kovel
Living people
Soviet footballers
Association football defenders
Association football forwards
Ukrainian footballers
FC SKA-Karpaty Lviv players
FC Volyn Lutsk players
FC Dnipro players
FC Metalurh Zaporizhzhia players
FC Asmaral Moscow players
FC Sokol Saratov players
FC Torpedo Zaporizhzhia players
FC Tiraspol players
MFC Mykolaiv players
SSSOR Metalurh Zaporizhzhia players
Soviet Top League players
Ukrainian Premier League players
Russian Premier League players
Moldovan Super Liga players
Ukrainian expatriate footballers
Expatriate footballers in Russia
Expatriate footballers in Moldova
Ukrainian football managers
FC Metalurh Zaporizhzhia managers
Sportspeople from Volyn Oblast